Numerous Cyrillic alphabets are based on the Cyrillic script. The early Cyrillic alphabet was developed in the 9th century AD and replaced the earlier Glagolitic script developed by the Byzantine theologians Cyril and Methodius. It is the basis of alphabets used in various languages, past and present, Slavic origin, and non-Slavic languages influenced by Russian. As of 2011, around 252 million people in Eurasia use it as the official alphabet for their national languages. About half of them are in Russia. Cyrillic is one of the most-used writing systems in the world. The birth place of the Cyrillic alphabet is Bulgaria. The creator is Saint Clement of Ohrid from the Preslav literary school in the First Bulgarian Empire.

Some of these are illustrated below; for others, and for more detail, see the links. Sounds are transcribed in the IPA. While these languages largely have phonemic orthographies, there are occasional exceptions—for example, Russian  is pronounced  in a number of words, an orthographic relic from when they were pronounced  (e.g. его yego 'him/his', is pronounced  rather than ).

Spellings of names transliterated into the Roman alphabet may vary, especially й (y/j/i), but also г (gh/g/h) and ж (zh/j).

Unlike the Latin script, which is usually adapted to different languages by adding diacritical marks/supplementary glyphs (such as accents, umlauts, tildes and cedillas) to standard Roman letters, by assigning new phonetic values to existing letters (e.g. However, in some alphabets invented in the 19th century, such as Mari, Udmurt and Chuvash, umlauts and breves also were used.

Bulgarian and Bosnian Sephardim without Hebrew typefaces occasionally printed Judeo-Spanish in Cyrillic.

Spread 
Non-Slavic alphabets are generally modelled after Russian, but often bear striking differences, particularly when adapted for Caucasian languages. The first few of these alphabets were developed by Orthodox missionaries for the Finnic and Turkic peoples of Idel-Ural (Mari, Udmurt, Mordva, Chuvash, and Kerashen Tatars) in the 1870s. Later, such alphabets were created for some of the Siberian and Caucasus peoples who had recently converted to Christianity. In the 1930s, some of those languages were switched to the Uniform Turkic Alphabet. All of the peoples of the former Soviet Union who had been using an Arabic or other Asian script (Mongolian script etc.) also adopted Cyrillic alphabets, and during the Great Purge in the late 1930s, all of the Latin alphabets of the peoples of the Soviet Union were switched to Cyrillic as well (Lithuania, Latvia and Estonia were occupied and annexed by Soviet Union in 1940, and were not affected by this change). The Abkhazian and Ossetian languages were switched to Georgian script, but after the death of Joseph Stalin, both also adopted Cyrillic. The last language to adopt Cyrillic was the Gagauz language, which had used Greek script before.

In Uzbekistan, Azerbaijan and Turkmenistan, the use of Cyrillic to write local languages has often been a politically controversial issue since the collapse of the Soviet Union, as it evokes the era of Soviet rule and Russification. Some of Russia's peoples such as the Tatars have also tried to drop Cyrillic, but the move was halted under Russian law. A number of languages have switched from Cyrillic to either a Roman-based orthography or a return to a former script.

Cyrillic alphabets continue to be used in several Slavic (Russian, Ukrainian, Serbian, Bulgarian, Macedonian, Belarusian) and non-Slavic (Kazakh, Uzbek, Kyrgyz, Tajik, Azeri, Gagauz, Turkmen, Mongolian) languages.

Common letters 
The following table lists the Cyrillic letters which are used in the alphabets of most of the national languages which use a Cyrillic alphabet. Exceptions and additions for particular languages are noted below.

Slavic languages 
Cyrillic alphabets used by Slavic languages can be divided into two categories:
 East South Slavic languages and East Slavic languages, such as Bulgarian and Russian, share common features such as Й, ь, and я.
 West South Slavic languages, such as all varieties of Serbo-Croatian, share common features such as Ј and љ.

East Slavic

Russian 

 Yo (Ё ё) 
 The Hard Sign¹ (Ъ ъ) indicates no palatalization²
 Yery (Ы ы) indicates  (an allophone of )
 E (Э э) 
 Ж and Ш indicate sounds that are retroflex

Notes:
In the pre-reform Russian orthography, in Old East Slavic and in Old Church Slavonic the letter is called yer. Historically, the "hard sign" takes the place of a now-absent vowel, which is still preserved as a distinct vowel in Bulgarian (which represents it with ъ) and Slovene (which is written in the Latin alphabet and writes it as e), but only in some places in the word.
When an iotated vowel (vowel whose sound begins with ) follows a consonant, the consonant is palatalized. The Hard Sign indicates that this does not happen, and the  sound will appear only in front of the vowel. The Soft Sign indicates that the consonant should be palatalized in addition to a  preceding the vowel. The Soft Sign also indicates that a consonant before another consonant or at the end of a word is palatalized. Examples: та; тя; тья; тъя; т; ть.

Before 1918, there were four extra letters in use: Іі (replaced by Ии), Ѳѳ (Фита "Fita", replaced by Фф), Ѣѣ (Ять "Yat", replaced by Ее), and Ѵѵ (ижица "Izhitsa", replaced by Ии); these were eliminated by reforms of Russian orthography.

Belarusian 

The Belarusian alphabet displays the following features:
 He (Г г) represents a voiced velar fricative /ɣ/.
 Yo (Ё ё) 
 I (І і), also known as the dotted I or decimal I, resembles the Latin letter I. Unlike Russian and Ukrainian, "И" is not used.
 Short I (Й й), however, uses the base И glyph.
 Short U (Ў ў) is the letter У with a breve and represents , or like the u part of the diphthong in loud. The use of the breve to indicate a semivowel is analogous to the Short I (Й).
 A combination of Sh and Ch (ШЧ шч) is used where those familiar only with Russian and or Ukrainian would expect Shcha (Щ щ).
 Yery (Ы ы) 
 E (Э э) 
 An apostrophe (’) is used to indicate depalatalization of the preceding consonant. This orthographical symbol used instead of the traditional Cyrillic letter Yer (Ъ), also known as the hard sign.
 The letter combinations Dzh (Дж дж) and Dz (Дз дз) appear after D (Д д) in the Belarusian alphabet in some publications. These digraphs represent consonant clusters Дж  and Дз  correspondingly. 
 Before 1933, the letter Ґ ґ (Ge) was used.

Ukrainian 

The Ukrainian alphabet displays the following features:

Ve (В) represents  (which may be pronounced  in a word final position and before consonants).
He (Г, г) represents a voiced glottal fricative,.
Ge (Ґ, ґ) appears after He, represents . It looks like He with an "upturn" pointing up from the right side of the top bar. (This letter was removed in Soviet Ukraine in 1933–1990, so it may be missing from older Cyrillic fonts.)
E (Е, е) represents .
Ye (Є, є) appears after E, represents .
E, И (И, и) represent  if unstressed.
I (І, і) appears after Y, represents .
Yi (Ї, ї) appears after I, represents .
Yy (Й, й) represents .
Shcha (Щ, щ) represents .
An apostrophe (’) is used to mark nonpalatalization of the preceding consonant before Ya (Я, я), Yu (Ю, ю), Ye (Є, є), Yi (Ї, ї).
As in Belarusian Cyrillic, the sounds ,  are represented by digraphs Дж and Дз respectively.

Rusyn 

The Rusyn language is spoken by the Carpatho-Rusyns in Carpathian Ruthenia, Slovakia, and Poland, and the Pannonian Rusyns in Croatia and Serbia.

The Rusyn alphabet differs from Ukrainian in that the letters Ё, Ы, and the hard sign (Ъ), from Russian, are also used.

*Letters absent from Pannonian Rusyn.

South Slavic

Bosnian

Bulgarian 

The Bulgarian alphabet features:
 Е represents  and is called "е" .
 Yot (Й, й) represents .
 Щ represents  and is called "щъ" .
 Ъ represents the vowel , and is called  "ер голям"  ('big er'). In spelling however, Ъ is referred to as  where its official label "ер голям" (used only to refer to Ъ in the alphabet) may cause some confusion.
 Ь is used on rare occasions (only after a consonant [and] before the vowel "о"), such as in the words 'каньон' (canyon), 'шофьор' (driver), etc. It is called "ер малък" ('small er').
The Cyrillic alphabet was originally developed in the First Bulgarian Empire during the 9th – 10th century AD at the Preslav Literary School.

It has been used in Bulgaria (with modifications and exclusion of certain archaic letters via spelling reforms) continuously since then, superseding the previously used Glagolitic alphabet, which was also invented and used there before the Cyrillic script overtook its use as a written script for the Bulgarian language. The Cyrillic alphabet was used in the then much bigger territory of Bulgaria (including most of today's Serbia), North Macedonia, Kosovo, Albania, Northern Greece (Macedonia region), Romania and Moldova, officially from 893. It was also transferred from Bulgaria and adopted by the East Slavic languages in Kievan Rus' and evolved into the Russian alphabet and the alphabets of many other Slavic (and later non-Slavic) languages. Later, some Slavs modified it and added/excluded letters from it to better suit the needs of their own language varieties.

Croatian 
Historically, the Croatian language briefly used the Cyrillic script in areas with large Croatian language or Bosnian language populations.

Serbian 

South Slavic Cyrillic alphabets (with the exception of Bulgarian) are generally derived from Serbian Cyrillic. It, and by extension its descendants, differs from the East Slavic ones in that the alphabet has generally been simplified: Letters such as Я, Ю, and Ё, representing /ja/, /ju/, and /jo/ in Russian, respectively, have been removed. Alphabets based on the Serbian that add new letters often do so by adding an acute accent  over an existing letter.

The Serbian alphabet shows the following features:

 E represents .
 Between Д and E is the letter Dje (Ђ, ђ), which represents , and looks like Tshe, except that the loop of the h curls farther and dips downwards.
 Between И and К is the letter Je (Ј, ј), represents , which looks like the Latin letter J.
 Between Л and М is the letter Lje (Љ, љ), representing , which looks like a ligature of Л and the Soft Sign.
 Between Н and О is the letter Nje (Њ, њ), representing , which looks like a ligature of Н and the Soft Sign.
 Between Т and У is the letter Tshe (Ћ, ћ), representing  and looks like a lowercase Latin letter h with a bar. On the uppercase letter, the bar appears at the top; on the lowercase letter, the bar crosses the top at half of the vertical line.
 Between Ч and Ш is the letter Dzhe (Џ, џ), representing , which looks like Tse but with the descender moved from the right side of the bottom bar to the middle of the bottom bar.
 Ш is the last letter.
 Certain letters are handwritten differently, as seen in the adjacent image.

Macedonian 

The Macedonian alphabet differs from Serbian in the following ways:

 Between Ze (З з) and I (И и) is the letter Dze (Ѕ ѕ), which looks like the Latin letter S and represents .
 Dje (Ђ ђ) is replaced by Gje (Ѓ ѓ), which represents  (voiced palatal stop). In some dialects, it represents  instead, like Dje. It is written  in the corresponding Macedonian Latin alphabet.
 Tshe (Ћ ћ) is replaced by Kje (Ќ ќ), which represents  (voiceless palatal stop). In some dialects, it represents  instead, like Tshe. It is written  in the corresponding Macedonian Latin alphabet.
 Certain letters are handwritten differently, as seen in the adjacent image.

Montenegrin 

The Montenegrin alphabet differs from Serbian in the following ways:

 Between Ze (З з) and I (И и) is the letter З́, which represents  (voiced alveolo-palatal fricative).
 Between Es (С с) and Te (Т т) is the letter С́, which represents  (voiceless alveolo-palatal fricative).
 The letter Dze (Ѕ ѕ), from Macedonian, is used in scientific literature when representing the  phoneme, although it is not officially part of the alphabet. A Latin equivalent was proposed that looks identical to Ze (З з).

Uralic languages 
Uralic languages using the Cyrillic script (currently or in the past) include:
Finnic: Karelian until 1921 and 1937–1940 (Ludic, Olonets Karelian); Veps; Votic
Kildin Sami in Russia (since the 1980s)
Komi (Zyrian  (since the 17th century, modern alphabet since the 1930s); Permyak; Yodzyak)
Udmurt
Khanty
Mansi (writing has not received distribution since 1937)
Samoyedic: Enets; Yurats; Nenets since 1937 (Forest Nenets; Tundra Nenets); Nganasan; Kamassian; Koibal; Mator; Selkup (since the 1950s; not used recently)
Mari, since the 19th century (Hill; Meadow)
Mordvin, since the 18th century (Erzya; Moksha)
Other: Merya; Muromian; Meshcherian

Karelian 

The Karelian language was written in the Cyrillic script in various forms until 1940 when publication in Karelian ceased in favor of Finnish, except for Tver Karelian, written in a Latin alphabet. In 1989 publication began again in the other Karelian dialects and Latin alphabets were used, in some cases with the addition of Cyrillic letters such as ь.

Kildin Sámi 

Over the last century, the alphabet used to write Kildin Sámi has changed three times: from Cyrillic to Latin and back again to Cyrillic. Work on the latest version of the official orthography commenced in 1979. It was officially approved in 1982 and started to be widely used by 1987.

Komi-Permyak 

The Komi-Permyak Cyrillic alphabet:

Mari alphabets 

Meadow Mari Cyrillic alphabet:

Hill Mari Cyrillic alphabet

Non-Slavic Indo-European languages

Iranian languages

Kurdish 

Kurds in the former Soviet Union use a Cyrillic alphabet:

Ossetian 

The Ossetic language has officially used the Cyrillic script since 1937.

Tajik 

The Tajik alphabet is written using a Cyrillic-based alphabet.

Other 
Shughni
Tat
Judeo-Tat
Yaghnobi
Yazghulami

Romance languages 

Romanian (up to the 19th century; see Romanian Cyrillic alphabet).
The Moldovan language (an alternative name of the Romanian language in Bessarabia, Moldavian ASSR, Moldavian SSR and Moldova) used varieties of the Romanian Cyrillic alphabet in 1812–1918, and the Moldovan Cyrillic alphabet (derived from the Russian alphabet and standardised in the Soviet Union) in 1924–1932 and 1938–1989. Nowadays, this alphabet is still official in the unrecognized republic of Transnistria (see Moldovan Cyrillic alphabet).
Ladino in occasional Bulgarian Sephardic publications.

Indo-Aryan

Romani 
Romani is written in Cyrillic in Serbia, Montenegro, Bulgaria and the former USSR.

Mongolian 

The Mongolic languages include Khalkha (in Mongolia; Cyrillic is official since 1941, in practice from 1946), Buryat (around Lake Baikal; Cyrillic is used since the 1930s) and Kalmyk (northwest of the Caspian Sea; Cyrillic is used in various forms since the 1920-30s). Khalkha Mongolian is also written with the Mongol vertical alphabet, which was the official script before 1941. Since the beginning of the 1990s Mongolia has been making attempts to extend the rather limited use of Mongol script and the most recent National Plan for Mongol Script aims to bring its use to the same level as Cyrillic by 2025 and maintain a dual-script system (digraphia).

Overview 

This table contains all the characters used.

Һһ is shown twice as it appears at two different locations in Buryat and Kalmyk

Khalkha 

В в = 
Е е = , 
Ё ё = 
Ж ж = 
З з = 
Ий ий = 
Й й = the second element of closing diphthongs (ай, ой, etc.) and long  (ий), it never indicates /j/ in native words
Н н = , 
Ө ө = 
У у = 
Ү ү = 
Ы ы =  (in suffixes after a hard consonant)
Ь ь = palatalization of the preceding consonant
Ю ю = , 

Long vowels are indicated with double letters. The Cyrillic letters Кк, Пп, Фф and Щщ are not used in native Mongolian words, but only for Russian or other loans (Пп may occur in native onomatopoeic words).

Buryat 
The Buryat (буряад) Cyrillic script is similar to the Khalkha above, but Ьь indicates palatalization as in Russian. Buryat does not use Вв, Кк, Пп, Фф, Цц, Чч, Щщ or Ъъ in its native words (Пп may occur in native onomatopoeic words).

Е е = , 
Ё ё = 
Ж ж = 
Й й = the second element of closing diphthongs (ай, ой, etc.), it never indicates /j/ in native words
Н н = , 
Өө өө = , ө does not occur in short form in literary Buryat based on the Khori dialect
У у = 
Ү ү = 
Һ һ = 
Ы ы = , 
Ю ю =

Kalmyk 
The Kalmyk (хальмг) Cyrillic script differs from Khalkha in some respects: there are additional letters (Әә, Җҗ, Ңң), letters Ээ, Юю and Яя appear only word-initially, long vowels are written double in the first syllable (нөөрин), but single in syllables after the first. Short vowels are omitted altogether in syllables after the first syllable (хальмг = ). Жж and Пп are used in loanwords only (Russian, Tibetan, etc.), but Пп may occur in native onomatopoeic words.

Ә ә = 
В в = 
Һ һ = 
Е е = , 
Җ җ = 
Ң ң = 
Ө ө = 
У у = 
Ү ү =

Caucasian languages

Northwest Caucasian languages 
Living Northwest Caucasian languages are generally written using Cyrillic alphabets.

Abkhaz 

Abkhaz is a Caucasian language, spoken in the Autonomous Republic of Abkhazia, Georgia.

Other 
Abaza
Adyghe
Kabardian

Northeast Caucasian languages 
Northeast Caucasian languages are generally written using Cyrillic alphabets.

Avar 

Avar is a Caucasian language, spoken in the Republic of Dagestan, of the Russian Federation, where it is co-official together with other Caucasian languages like Dargwa, Lak, Lezgian and Tabassaran. All these alphabets, and other ones (Abaza, Adyghe, Chechen, Ingush, Kabardian) have an extra sign: palochka (Ӏ), which gives voiceless occlusive consonants its particular ejective sound.

В = 
гъ = 
гь = 
гӀ = 
къ = 
кӀ = 
кь = 
кӀкӀ = , is also written ЛӀ лӀ.
кк = , is also written Лъ лъ.
тӀ = 
х = 
хъ = 
хь = 
хӀ = 
цӀ = 
чӀ = 
Double consonants, called "fortis", are pronounced longer than single consonants (called "lenis").

Lezgian 

Lezgian is spoken by the Lezgins, who live in southern Dagestan and northern Azerbaijan. Lezgian is a literary language and an official language of Dagestan.

Other 
Chechen (since 1938, also with Roman 1991–2000, but switch back to Cyrillic alphabets since 2001.)
Dargwa
Lak
Tabassaran
Ingush
Archi

Turkic languages

Azerbaijani 

Latin Alphabet (as of 1992) Aa, Bb, Cc, Çç, Dd, Ee, Əə, Ff, Gg, Ğğ, Hh, Iı, İi, Jj, Kk, Ll, Mm, Nn, Oo, Öö, Pp, Qq, Rr, Ss, Şş, Tt, Uu, Üü, Vv, (Ww), Xx, Yy, Zz

Bashkir 
The Cyrillic script was used for the Bashkir language after the winter of 1938.

Chuvash 

The Cyrillic alphabet is used for the Chuvash language since the late 19th century, with some changes in 1938.

Kazakh 

Kazakh can be alternatively written in the Latin alphabet. Latin is going to be the only used alphabet in 2022, alongside the modified Arabic alphabet (in the People's Republic of China, Iran and Afghanistan).

Ә ә = 
Ғ ғ =  (voiced uvular fricative)
Е е = 
И и = 
Қ қ =  (voiceless uvular plosive)
Ң ң = 
О о = 
Ө ө = 
Ұ ұ = 
Ү ү = 
Һ һ = 
Ы ы = 
І і = 

The Cyrillic letters Вв, Ёё, Цц, Чч, Щщ, Ъъ, Ьь and Ээ are not used in native Kazakh words, but only for Russian loans.

Kyrgyz 

Kyrgyz has also been written in Latin and in Arabic.

Ң ң =  (velar nasal)
Ү ү =  (close front rounded vowel)
Ө ө =  (open-mid front rounded vowel)

Tatar 

Tatar has used Cyrillic since 1939, but the Russian Orthodox Tatar community has used Cyrillic since the 19th century. In 2000 a new Latin alphabet was adopted for Tatar, but it is used generally on the Internet.

Ә ә = 
Ң ң = 
Ө ө = 
Ү ү = 
Һ һ = 
Җ җ = 

The Cyrillic letters Ёё, Цц, Щщ are not used in native Tatar words, but only for Russian loans.

Turkmen 

Turkmen, written 1940–1994 exclusively in Cyrillic, since 1994 officially in Roman, but in everyday communication Cyrillic is still used along with Roman script.

Latin alphabet version 2 Aa, Ää, Bb, (Cc), Çç, Dd, Ee, Ff, Gg, Hh, Ii, Jj, Kk, Ll, Mm, Nn, Ňň, Oo, Öö, Pp, (Qq), Rr, Ss, Şş, Tt, Uu, Üü, (Vv), Ww, (Xx), Yy, Ýý, Zz, Žž

Latin alphabet version 1 Aa, Bb, Çç, Dd, Ee, Êê, Ff, Gg, Hh, Ii, Jj, Žž, Kk, Ll, Mm, Nn, Ññ, Oo, Ôô, Pp, Rr, Ss, Şş, Tt, Uu, Ûû, Ww, Yy, Ýý, Zz

Uzbek 

From 1941 the Cyrillic script was used exclusively.  In 1998 the government has adopted a Latin alphabet to replace it. The deadline for making this transition has however been repeatedly changed, and Cyrillic is still more common. It is not clear that the transition will be made at all.

В в = 
Ж ж = 
Ф ф = 
Х х = 
Ъ ъ = 
Ў ў = 
Қ қ = 
Ғ ғ = 
Ҳ ҳ =

Other 
Altai
Crimean Tatar (1938–1991, now mostly replaced by Roman)
Gagauz (1957–1990s, exclusively in Cyrillic, since 1990s officially in Roman, but in reality in everyday communication Cyrillic is used along with Roman script)
Karachay-Balkar
Karakalpak (1940s–1990s)
Karaim (20th century)
Khakas
Kumyk
Nogai
Tuvan
Uyghur – Uyghur Cyrillic alphabet (Uyghur Siril Yëziqi). Used along with Uyghur Arabic alphabet (Uyghur Ereb Yëziqi), New Script (Uyghur Yëngi Yëziqi, Pinyin-based), and modern Uyghur Latin alphabet (Uyghur Latin Yëziqi).
Yakut
Dolgan
Balkan Gagauz Turkish
Urum
Siberian Tatar
Siberian Turkic

Sinitic

Dungan language

Since 1953.

 Letters in bold are used only in Russian loanwords.

Tungusic languages 
Even
Evenk (since 1937)
Nanai
Udihe (Udekhe) (not used recently)
Orok (since 2007)
Ulch (since late 1980s)

Chukotko-Kamchatkan languages 
Chukchi (since 1936)
Koryak (since 1936)
Itelmen (since late 1980s)
Alyutor

Languages of North America 
Aleut (Bering dialect)
Naukan Yupik
Central Siberian Yupik
Chaplino dialect

Other languages 
 Ainu (in Russia)
 Assyrian Neo-Aramaic (Aisor)
 Ket (since 1980s)
 Nivkh
 Tlingit (in Russian Alaska)
 Yukaghirs (Tundra Yukaghir, Forest Yukaghir)

Constructed languages 
International auxiliary languages
 Interslavic
 Lingua Franca Nova
Fictional languages
 Brutopian (Donald Duck stories)
 Syldavian (The Adventures of Tintin)

Summary table 
Letters:

See also 
 List of Cyrillic letters
 Cyrillic script
 Cyrillic script in Unicode
 Old Church Slavonic

References

Further reading 
 Ivan G. Iliev. Short History of the Cyrillic Alphabet. Plovdiv. 2012. Short History of the Cyrillic Alphabet
 Philipp Ammon: Tractatus slavonicus. in: Sjani (Thoughts) Georgian Scientific Journal of Literary Theory and Comparative Literature, N 17, 2016, pp. 248–56
 Appendix:Cyrillic script, Wiktionary

External links

 Cyrillic Alphabets of Slavic Languages review of Cyrillic charsets in Slavic Languages.